ArcSoft, Inc. is a photo and video imaging software development company that offers various imaging technologies across devices with major platforms – from smartphones, tablets, PCs, smart TVs, digital cameras to cloud based enterprise solutions.

Established in 1994, ArcSoft is a private company with 800 employees, including more than 600 scientists and engineers. ArcSoft is headquartered in Fremont, California, with regional commercial and development facilities in Europe and Asia, specifically Taipei, Seoul, Tokyo, Shanghai, Hangzhou, and Nanjing. Michael Deng, ArcSoft's CEO, founded the company with $150.000 in funding from family and friends.

References

Companies based in Fremont, California
Software companies based in the San Francisco Bay Area
Companies listed on the Shanghai Stock Exchange
Software companies of the United States
1994 establishments in the United States
1994 establishments in California
Software companies established in 1994
American companies established in 1994